The Birmingham Ladywood by-election of 18 August 1977 was held after Labour Member of Parliament (MP) Brian Walden resigned in order to concentrate on his career as a journalist and broadcaster. A safe Labour seat, it was retained by the party.

At the count, the Socialist Unity candidate, Raghib Ahsan, punched the National Front candidate, Anthony Reed Herbert.

Results

References

Birmingham Ladywood by-election
Birmingham Ladywood by-election
Birmingham Ladywood by-election
Ladywood, 1977
Ladywood by-election, 1977